Rumkale ( 'Roman Castle'), also known as Urumgala, is a fortress on the Euphrates, located in the province of Gaziantep and 50 km west of Şanlıurfa.

Its strategic location was already known to the Assyrians, although the present structure is largely Hellenistic and Roman in origin. It is said that John, an apostle of Jesus, lived in Rumkale during Roman times. The site was occupied by various Byzantine and Armenian warlords during the Middle Ages.  During the 12th century, it also became the seat of an Armenian bishop. In 1179, a synod took place in Rumkale, attempting a compromise between the Greeks and the Armenians. From 1203 to 1293, it served as the residence of the Catholicos of the Armenian Church. In 1293, it was captured by the Mamluks of Egypt following a protracted siege who then named it Qal'at al-Muslimin.

Access

The fortress, now situated across a peninsula created by the reservoir of Birecik Dam and within the administrative boundaries of Gaziantep's Nizip district, is currently accessible by boat either from the neighboring site of Zeugma or from the town of Halfeti. As of March 2017, it was not possible to land at the site; extensive (re)building is underway inside the fortress and on the external walls.

Flooding
Much of the surrounding work of the fortress, along with local villages and farmland, has been flooded; it is not clear how much of the entrance up from the western side remains undamaged by the rising waters.

Gallery

References

Further reading
 Reuven Amitai-Preiss (1995), Mongols and Mamluks: The Mamluk-Īlkhānid War, 1260-1281, pp. 179–225. Cambridge University Press, .
 Angus Stewart  (2006), 'Hromgla', in Alan V. Murray (ed.), The Crusades:  An Encyclopaedia, II, p. 607. ABC-CLIO, Inc., 

Buildings and structures in Gaziantep Province
Castles in Turkey
Armenian buildings in Turkey
Nizip District
Armenian churches in Turkey
Christian monasteries in Armenia